Spartans Futsal Club is a London-based futsal team, currently competing in the FA Futsal League - Southern Conference.

History
The club was founded in 2009 by former White Bear FC coach Oleksandr Saliy, who now is the president of Spartans. The club was formed after the merger FC White Bear and Ipswich Wolves. The club's manager is Jorge Ribeiro, the coach that lead Ipswich Wolves to winning the Futsal Premier League.

The team has proven to be one of the strongest forces in the UK, and this can be seen on their league results. They had a wonderful start to the season and finished of in style by topping the Southern Conference of the FA Futsal League with 38 points out of 42, including a 9–4 win against English Champions Helvecia FC in the last fixture. During their quest for the Southern Championship, they established a big rivalry with Helvecia FC. After becoming Southern Champions, Pivot Hugo Costa became the first player to win all three Conferences after winning the Northern and Midlands Conference in the previous 2 years.

Grand Finals:

In the 2010 national league grand finals, they reached the final and once again their opposite was Helvecia, they were close to the victory when they were winning 4-1 before half time but they eventually lost 11-8 after extra time in what it proved to be one of the best Futsal matches England has ever seen, although they lost many think this is the beginning of a great team in the country but Helvecia also showed they had champions attitude and more experience than the young team of Spartans. Captain Bruno Ferrage won the player of the tournament award.

Current squad

External links
 thefa.com
 www.fcspartans.net

Futsal clubs in England
Sports teams in London
Futsal clubs established in 2009
2009 establishments in England